The 1998–99 FIRA Tournament, was a rugby union tournament organized by the Fédération Internationale de Rugby Amateur (FIRA).

The tournament did not assign a champion. Only minnow teams participated, because Romania, Georgia, Morocco, Portugal and Netherlands were still involved in qualification for Rugby World Cup.

The teams were divided into different division and Pools. Russia won the Gold or Division 2.

"GOLD" (Division 2)

"SILVER" (Division 3)

Pool 1 

The two matches scheduled in Serbia and Montegnegro were cancelled due to the Kosovo War.

Pool 2

Pool 3

"BRONZE"  (Division 4)

Bibliography 
 Francesco Volpe, Valerio Vecchiarelli (2000), 2000 Italia in Meta, Storia della nazionale italiana di rugby dagli albori al Sei Nazioni, GS Editore (2000) .
 Francesco Volpe, Paolo Pacitti (Author), Rugby 2000, GTE Gruppo Editorale (1999).

1998-99
1998–99 in European rugby union
1998 rugby union tournaments for national teams
1999 rugby union tournaments for national teams